Shannonville Motorsport Park is a motorsport road course circuit in Canada. It is located 15 km east of Belleville, Ontario, roughly midway between Toronto and Montreal, Quebec, near Highway 401 and along the former Provincial Highway 2.

It has many configurations, and its tight layout with much run-off space makes it a very good venue for race testing.  Many race teams from Toronto and Montreal test at Shannonville in preparation for events held on street circuits, as the Shannonville raceway shares a lot of the same characteristics.

The raceway first started off as a dirt oval, with bedrock for a front straight.  Much later, the 1.8 km "Nelson" circuit was built, named after the late John Nelson, owner of the circuit at the time.  From there, the 2.23 km "Fabi" circuit was built north of the Nelson, and the two were linked to form the 4.03 km, 14-corner "Long Track".  The Fabi circuit was named after Bertrand Fabi, a young Canadian driver who died while testing a Formula 3 car in England.  The Fabi circuit has a long backstraight that now doubles as a drag strip.  A link was then made after the first corner on the Nelson circuit to the seventh corner of the Long Circuit, creating the 2.47 km "Pro Circuit" layout.

Currently, the Canadian Touring Car Championship makes an annual visit to the facility, as well as auto-racing body CASC (Regional Road Races). Drag racing is also heavily featured there.

See also
 List of auto racing tracks in Canada

References

External links
Shannonville Motorsport Park
Trackpedia guide to Shannonville Motorsport Park

Motorsport venues in Ontario
Drag racing venues in Canada
Road racing venues in Canada
Sports venues completed in 1979
1979 establishments in Ontario
Hastings County